Edwin M. Capps (December 23, 1860 – January 16, 1938) was an American Democratic politician from California.

Biography
Capps was born 1860 in Knoxville, Tennessee. His father was Thomas J. Capps, professor of mathematics at East Tennessee University.  He grew in Shelbyville, Illinois and his family moved to Golden, Colorado where he apprenticed as a civil engineer.

In 1886 Capps moved to San Diego where he was a mining engineer and real estate agent. He became city engineer of San Diego in 1893 and designed the new city police station and jail in 1911 and the beautiful Spruce Street suspension footbridge in 1912. He was in charge of harbor improvements in 1912, to handle increased traffic anticipated by the completion of the Panama Canal.  He came up with the "Capps' Plan" to dredge the harbor, fill the shoreline, and erect piers, wharves, seawalls, and warehouses.

Capps served twice as mayor, 1899–1901 and 1915–1917. He was San Diego's first Democratic mayor.
In 1915 San Diego was suffering from a multi-year drought.  In December 1915, Capps and the city council hired a rainmaker, who guaranteed rain and wouldn't charge if it didn't rain, Charley Hatfield. He supposedly achieved success in 1904 in Los Angeles. Hatfield set up shop in Mission Valley by burning noxious fumes to "seed" clouds. However, what happened was a disastrous flood in January 1916 and the city reneged on the contract and refused to pay Hatfield anything.

Capps thought the future in San Diego was tourism, rather than factories. Developing tourist facilities and preserving San Diego's unique environment was the cornerstone of his service as engineer and mayor. Capps had a colorful personality and was outspoken about his plans. This caused many arguments and he was often the talk about town.

Capps retired in 1923 and died 1938 in Los Angeles.

Quote
We should cater to the entertainment of the tourist, make pleasant and congenial, have public places of resort in the nature of beautiful parks, fine boulevards, roads and drives.

Notes

Further reading
 ,  v. 2, pp. 403–404: "Edwin M. Capps"

External links
 "'Bull Strong, Horse High, and Hog Tight:' The Work and Character of Edwin M. Capps", The Journal of San Diego History 30:3 (Summer 1984) by John C. Brownlee

1860 births
1938 deaths
Mayors of San Diego
People from Shelbyville, Illinois
People from Golden, Colorado
Politicians from Knoxville, Tennessee